Timo Zaal (born  9 February 2004) is a Dutch footballer who plays for SC Heerenveen.

Personal life
Zaal is from Leeuwarden, his uncles Pieter and Arnold Herder played football for SC Cambuur.

Career
Zaal made his professional debut appearing as a substitute in a 3-1 Eredivisie victory as SC Heerenveen played FC Groningen at the Abe Lenstra Stadion on 10 April 2022. Zaal commented afterwards that t was good for him to get the debut out of the way because the expectations had long been for him that it would be a question of “when, not if”, he would eventually play for the first team.

International career
In September 2022 Zaal was included in the Dutch U19 squad.

References

External links
 

Living people
2004 births
SC Heerenveen players
Dutch footballers
Eredivisie players
21st-century Dutch people